Warning is a 1946 Slovak drama film directed by Martin Frič and Paľo Bielik.

Cast
 Paľo Bielik as Ondrej Muranica
 Július Pántik as Miso
 Andrej Bagar
 Mikulás Huba as Ing. Gregor
 Ondrej Jariabek
 Frantisek Zvarík

References

External links
 

1946 films
1946 drama films
1940s Czech-language films
Czechoslovak drama films
Czechoslovak black-and-white films
Films directed by Martin Frič
Slovak drama films